Puerto Rico Highway 157 (PR-157) is a rural road that travels from Ciales, Puerto Rico to Orocovis. It begins at its intersection with PR-149 in Toro Negro and ends at its junction with PR-155 near downtown Orocovis.

Major intersections

See also

 List of highways numbered 157

References

External links
 

157